Sabri Ameri (born 31 January 1993) is a Tunisian football midfielder who currently plays for Saudi Arabian club Bisha.

Career
On 25 August 2022, Ameri joined Saudi Arabian club Bisha.

References

1993 births
Living people
Tunisian footballers
JS Kairouan players
US Ben Guerdane players
Stade Tunisien players
Bisha FC players
Association football midfielders
Tunisian Ligue Professionnelle 1 players
Saudi Second Division players
Tunisian expatriate footballers
Expatriate footballers in Saudi Arabia
Tunisian expatriate sportspeople in Saudi Arabia